Osmitopsis is a genus of African flowering plants in the chamomile tribe within the daisy family.

Species

References

Flora of Africa
Anthemideae
Asteraceae genera